{{DISPLAYTITLE:C20H22N2O2}}
The molecular formula C20H22N2O2 (molar mass: 322.41 g/mol, exact mass: 322.1681 u) may refer to:

 Akuammicine
 Gelsemine
 Oil Blue A
 Pleiocarpamine
 Strictamine